South Gosforth is a Tyne and Wear Metro station, serving the suburb of Gosforth, Newcastle upon Tyne in Tyne and Wear, England. It joined the network on 11 August 1980, following the opening of the first phase of the network, between Haymarket and Tynemouth via Four Lane Ends.

History
The station was opened as Gosforth on 27 June 1864 by the Blyth and Tyne Railway. It was later renamed South Gosforth on 1 March 1905, following to the opening of the nearby West Gosforth on the Gosforth and Ponteland Light Railway.

The original pre-grouping footbridge remains in use at South Gosforth. A similar footbridge removed from Percy Main has since been preserved by the National Railway Museum in York.

The station is located near to the South Gosforth Traction Maintenance Depot, which is located between stations at South Gosforth, Longbenton and Regent Centre. The depot, which opened in October 1923 under the London and North Eastern Railway, now serves as a facility for cleaning, storing and maintaining a fleet of 89 Metrocars.

The station also houses the Metro Control Centre. It is responsible for operating the network's signalling and electrical supply, as well as being used to communicate with train drivers and other staff, using two-way radio equipment.

Facilities 
Step-free access is available at all stations across the Tyne and Wear Metro network, with ramped access to platforms at South Gosforth. Between platforms, step-free access is by the road bridge on Station Road. The station is equipped with ticket machines, waiting shelter, seating, next train information displays, timetable posters, and an emergency help point on both platforms. Ticket machines are able to accept payment with credit and debit card (including contactless payment), notes and coins. The station is also fitted with smartcard validators, which feature at all stations across the network.

There is no dedicated car parking available at this station. There is the provision for cycle parking, with five cycle pods available for use.

Services 
, the station is served by up to ten trains per hour on weekdays and Saturday, and up to eight trains per hour during the evening and on Sunday.

Rolling stock used: Class 599 Metrocar

References

External links
 
 Timetable and station information for South Gosforth

Newcastle upon Tyne
1864 establishments in England
Railway stations in Great Britain opened in 1864
1980 establishments in England
Railway stations in Great Britain opened in 1980
Tyne and Wear Metro Green line stations
Tyne and Wear Metro Yellow line stations
Transport in Tyne and Wear
Former North Eastern Railway (UK) stations